The Cincinnati Bearcats baseball team represents The University of Cincinnati in NCAA Division I intercollegiate men's baseball competition.  The Bearcats currently compete in The American Athletic Conference

The University of Cincinnati began varsity intercollegiate competition in baseball in 1886.  Former Bearcats who have gone on to success in Major League Baseball include Sandy Koufax and manager Miller Huggins, 3-time All-Star and 2-time World Series Champion Kevin Youkilis, and  2-time MLB All-Star Josh Harrison.  The Bearcats are currently coached by Scott Googins. Cincinnati plays home games on UC's campus at UC Baseball Stadium.

The 2023 baseball season will mark the program's last season as a member of the AAC. In September 2021, Cincinnati, Houston, and UCF accepted bids to join the Big 12. On June 10, 2022 the American Athletic Conference and the three schools set to depart from the league (Cincinnati, Houston, UCF) announced that they had reached a buyout agreement that will allow those schools to join the Big 12 Conference in 2023.

Head coaches

Source:

Year-by-year results 

As of end through 2022 Season

UC in the NCAA tournament
The NCAA Division I baseball tournament started in 1947.
The format of the tournament has changed through the years.

Team Records

Single Game

Source:

No Hitters 
There have been 6 No-Hitters in Cincinnati baseball history, the last one occurred in 1995.

Retired numbers

Source:

All Americans 

 First Team All-Americans
1961 Bill Faul
1965 Billy Wolf
2015 Ian Happ

 Second Team All-Americans
1967 Pat Maginn
2000 Kevin Youkilis
2008 Josh Harrison
2009 Lance Durham

 Third Team All-Americans
1962 Bill Faul
2001 Kevin Youkilis

Honorable Mentions
1974 Tim Burman
1996 Steve Barhorst

Freshman All-Americans
1999 Chris Hamblen
2001 Tony Maynard
2002 Kyle Markle
2006 Steve Blevins
2006 Josh Harrison
2010 Andrew Strenge
2011 Justin Glass
2013 Ian Happ

UC and MLB 

Cincinnati had had 21 players reach Major League Baseball (MLB). Some notable alumni to reach the majors include Tony Campana and Josh Harrison who make their MLB debuts during the 2011 season. Two former Bearcats Miller Huggins and Sandy Koufax are members of the Baseball Hall of Fame. This list of Cincinnati Bearcats baseball players includes former members of the Cincinnati Bearcats baseball team that represents the University of Cincinnati, who have played in one or more regular season Major League Baseball (MLB) games.

Butch Alberts
Ethan Allen
Skeeter Barnes
Carl Bouldin
Ed BrinkmanAll Star, Gold Glove
Jack Bushelman
Tony Campana
Bill Faul
George Glinatsis
Josh Harrison2× MLB All-Star
Mike Hershberger
Ian Happ
Miller HugginsBaseball Hall of Fame manager
Sandy KoufaxBaseball Hall of Famer, 7× MLB All-Star, NL MVP, 3× Cy Young Award
Art Warren
Kevin Youkilis3x MLB All Star, Gold Glove, Hank Aaron Award

All Time MLB Draft Picks
Note: the first Major League Baseball draft was held in 1965.

6sc – June Secondary
1rg – January Draft
1sc – January Secondary Draft

Source:

See also
 List of NCAA Division I baseball programs
 Cincinnati Bearcats

References